Barnston, as a place, may refer to:

Barnston, Essex, a village and civil parish in Essex, England
Barnston, Merseyside, a village in Merseyside, England
Barnston Island, British Columbia, an island in British Columbia, Canada
Barnston, Quebec, a former township now part of Coaticook, Quebec, Canada
Barnston Mount, a mountain in Coaticook, Estrie, Quebec, Canada
Barnston Manor in Dorset, England

As a name: see

Barnston (surname)

Barnston, as a club, may refer to:

Barnston AFC, a village football team in Barnston Essex, England